Simon D. Hurley (born 7 December 1963) is an English professional golfer.

Hurley was born in Bristol, and turned professional in 1986. After ten years of playing on the second tier European Challenge Tour, and visiting qualifying school, he finally gained his European Tour card for 1996 when he finished 5th on the end of season Challenge Tour Rankings in 1995.

At the 1996 Catalan Open, his first event on the European Tour, Hurley hit a rock and damaged his arm, which required surgery. He was granted a medical exemption in 1997, but lost his card at the end of that season. He made it back to the tour in 1999 via qualifying school, but was again unable to retain his playing status.

Hurley has won twice on the Challenge Tour, the first coming in 1992 at the East Sussex National Challenge where he overcame Retief Goosen in a playoff. His second win came in the 1995 Memorial Olivier Barras.

Professional wins (4)

Challenge Tour wins (4)

See also
List of golfers with most Challenge Tour wins

External links

English male golfers
European Tour golfers
Sportspeople from Bristol
1963 births
Living people